Mohammed Abdi Kuti is a Kenyan politician and the former governor of Isiolo County from August 23, 2017. Kuti previously served as the senator for Isiolo county for one term (2013–2017), a post he was elected to as a member of the United Republican Party. He further represented the Isiolo North Constituency in the National Assembly of Kenya for 10 years  (2003-2013). He also held the positions of Minister for Youth Affairs in 2005 and Minister for Livestock from 2008 to 2013.

References

Living people
Members of the Senate of Kenya
United Republican Party (Kenya) politicians
National Rainbow Coalition – Kenya politicians
Members of the National Assembly (Kenya)
University of Nairobi alumni
1964 births